Kamalakanta Bhattacharya; 1853–1936) was a prominent essayist and poet belonged to the Oronodoi era of Assamese literature. He was born on 23 December 1853 in Gorehagi village, Biswanath Chariali, Sonitpur district,  Assam. He was popularly known as 'Agnikobi' (অগ্নিকবি). Politically, he was strongly nationalistic. He opposed the introduction of Bengali as the official language of Assam in 1871. At the annual meeting of the Indian National Congress in 1886 in Calcutta, he participated as a delegate for Assam. In 1929 he sat as Secretary General of the Organization Culture Asam Sahitya Sabha ago. He was also the president of the Asam Sahitya Sabha in 1929 held at Jorhat district, Assam. He campaigned for the abolition of the box security regulations and promoted the education of women. He also participated in the swadeshi movement in 1905–06.

Literary works
 Manat mor para Katha (autobiography)
 Chintanala ("The Fire of Thoughts", a collection of poems, 1870)
 Chinta Tarangini ("The Stream of Thought Waves", a collection of poems, 1933)
 Ashtabakrar Atmajivani
 Ashtabakra (poetry)

See also
 Assamese literature
 History of Assamese literature
 List of Asam Sahitya Sabha presidents
 List of Assamese writers with their pen names

References

External links
 Short biography at creative.sulekha.com.
 Few lines by Kamalakanta Bhattacharya from his article "Jatiyo Unnoti" at sarai.net.

Writers from Assam
Asom Sahitya Sabha Presidents
1853 births
1936 deaths
People from Sonitpur district
Assamese-language poets
19th-century Indian poets
20th-century Indian poets
Indian male essayists
20th-century Indian essayists
19th-century Indian essayists
19th-century Indian male writers
20th-century Indian male writers